Brevundimonas canariensis is a bacterium from the genus of Brevundimonas which has been isolated from roots of the plant Triticum aestivum from the Canary Islands in Spain.

References

External links
Type strain of Brevundimonas canariensis at BacDive -  the Bacterial Diversity Metadatabase

Bacteria described in 2017
Caulobacterales